The 2011 Catalan motorcycle Grand Prix was the fifth round of the 2011 Grand Prix motorcycle racing season. It took place on the weekend of 3–5 June 2011 at the Circuit de Catalunya. The race, which was won by Casey Stoner, was also notable for being the first pole position for Marco Simoncelli, before his death at the Malaysian race in October that year.

MotoGP classification

Moto2 classification

125 cc classification

Notes

Championship standings after the race (MotoGP)
Below are the standings for the top five riders and constructors after round five has concluded.

Riders' Championship standings

Constructors' Championship standings

 Note: Only the top five positions are included for both sets of standings.

References

Catalan motorcycle Grand Prix
Catalan
Catalan Motorcycle Grand Prix
motorcycle
Catalan motorcycle Grand Prix